The 1928 St. Ignatius Gray Fog football team was an American football team that represented St. Ignatius College (later renamed the University of San Francisco) as a member of the Far Western Conference (FWC) during the 1928 college football season. In its fifth season under head coach Jimmy Needles, the Gray Fog compiled a 4–4 record, tied for second place in the FWC, and was outscored by a total of 99 to 63.

Schedule

References

St. Ignatius
San Francisco Dons football seasons
St. Ignatius Gray Fog football